Ludwig Flamm (29 January 1885 - 4 December 1964) was an Austrian physicist.

Biography 
 
Ludwig Flamm, who came from a family of watchmakers, studied physics at the University of Vienna. In 1916 he was awarded the pro venia legendi at the Technische Universität Wien and in 1919 achieved a professorship. From 1922 to 1956 Flamm was a full professor and board member for physics at the Technische Universität Wien. He acted as dean from 1929 to 1931 and as rector from 1930 to 1931. Flamm was also a member of the Austrian Academy of Sciences. Flamm was married to Elsa, the youngest daughter of Ludwig Boltzmann. His son Dieter Flamm was a university professor at the Institute for Theoretical Physics of the University of Vienna since 1973.

Work 
Ludwig Flamm worked in various areas of theoretical physics, including quantum mechanics and the general relativity theory, and concerning the Schwarzschild metric, "Flamm's paraboloid". He was the first to describe solutions that lead to connections, now called wormholes, in the spacetime continuum.

Awards (partial list) 
 1961: Austrian Decoration for Science and Art
 1963: Erwin Schrödinger Prize
 The "Flammweg" in Simmering, Vienna, was named after him.

References 

 

Austrian physicists
1885 births
1964 deaths
Rectors of universities in Austria